This list of Grenadian writers includes those born in or associated with the island of Grenada.

A
 Joan Anim-Addo
 Peggy Antrobus (born 1935)

B
 Allister Bain (born 1935)
 Tobias S. Buckell (born 1979)
 Jean Buffong (born 1943)

C
 Bernard Coard (born 1945)
 Merle Collins (born 1950)

H
 Alister Hughes (1919–2005)
 Cynthia Hughes (died 1989)

J
 Gus John (born 1945)

R
 Don Rojas (born 1949)
 Jacob Ross (born 1956)

S
 Monica Skeete (1923-1997)

W
 Verna Wilkins

References

Grenadian writers
Grenada